Diversified Pharmaceutical Services entered the market in 1976 as the pharmacy benefit manager for United HealthCare, a leading managed care organization. It pioneered many cost containment strategies that are now core pharmacy benefit manager services and became a recognized leader in clinical programs.

History 
Diversified Pharmaceutical Services (DPS) grew out of the pharmacy department within United Healthcare.

The company was sold to SmithKline Beecham for $2.3 billion in May 1994. In 1999, it was acquired by Express Scripts in 1999 for $700 million in cash to create what was then the third largest pharmacy benefit manager in the United States.

References

Health maintenance organizations
Life sciences industry
Medical and health organizations based in Missouri
1994 mergers and acquisitions
1999 mergers and acquisitions